The 2004 Arkansas Razorbacks football team represented the University of Arkansas during the 2004 NCAA Division I-A football season. The Razorbacks played five home games at Donald W. Reynolds Razorback Stadium in Fayetteville, Arkansas and two home games at War Memorial Stadium in Little Rock, Arkansas. The Razorbacks were coached by head coach Houston Nutt.

Schedule

Source: Sports-Reference.com

Game summaries

New Mexico State

at No. 7 Texas

Louisiana–Monroe

Alabama

at No. 16 Florida

at No. 4 Auburn

No. 10 Georgia

at South Carolina

Ole Miss

at Mississippi State

No. 14 LSU

References

Arkansas
Arkansas Razorbacks football seasons
Arkansas Razorbacks football